Sally Woolsey is an American bridge player.

Woolsey has a silver medal in the 1994 Women's World Championship and three North American championships.
She is married to Kit Woolsey, who is a many-time national and world bridge champion.

Bridge accomplishments

Wins

 North American Bridge Championships (3)
 Grand National Teams (1) 2009 
 Sternberg Women's Board-a-Match Teams (1) 1990 
 Wagar Women's Knockout Teams (1) 1994

Runners-up

 World Women Knockout Teams Championship (McConnell Cup) (1) 1994
 North American Bridge Championships (6)
 Freeman Mixed Board-a-Match (1) 2010 
 Grand National Teams (1) 2006 
 Machlin Women's Swiss Teams (2) 1986, 1996 
 Sternberg Women's Board-a-Match Teams (1) 1992 
 Chicago Mixed Board-a-Match (1) 1997

Notes

External links
 

American contract bridge players